Taloussanomat is the largest business online daily newspaper in Helsinki, Finland.

History and profile
Taloussanomat was first published on 18 November 1997. The final printed number (the 2537th) was published on 28 December 2007 when it went online-only. It has its headquarters in Helsinki.

Taloussanomat is owned by Sanoma, owner of Helsingin Sanomat. In 2010 it was the thirteenth most visited website in Finland in 2010 and was visited by 643,954 people per week.

References

1997 establishments in Finland
2007 establishments in Finland
Daily newspapers published in Finland
Defunct newspapers published in Finland
Finnish-language newspapers
Newspapers published in Helsinki
Online newspapers with defunct print editions
Newspapers established in 1997
Publications disestablished in 2007
Business newspapers